Megacephalomana rivulosum is a species of moth of the  family Noctuidae (owlet moths). It is found in Madagascar.

Forewings, head and thorax of this species are violet-brown, hindwings and abdomen a little more greyish.  It has 4 pale traversal lines. 
It has a wingspan of 46mm.

References

Megacephalomana
Moths described in 1881
Moths of Madagascar
Moths of Africa